Mark Warren (September 24, 1938 –January 11, 1999) was an American television and film director. In 1971, became the first African American to win an Emmy Award for directing. He won for directing an episode of Rowan and Martin's Laugh-In featuring Orson Welles.

Career

Warren's career began in the early 1960s at the Canadian Broadcasting Company, where he became a producer and director in charge of variety programming. By the late 1960s, he was working in American television.  Besides Rowan and Martin's Laugh-In he directed episodes of several popular television series of 1970s and 1980s including: Sanford and Son, What's Happening!!, Barney Miller, and The Dukes of Hazard. He also directed the 1972 feature film, Come Back, Charleston Blue.

Death
He died of cancer on January 11, 1999, at Cedars-Sinai Medical Center in Los Angeles.

References

External links 
 
 

1938 births
1999 deaths
African-American television directors
American television directors
People from Harrodsburg, Kentucky
Primetime Emmy Award winners
20th-century African-American people